Arthur Nash may refer to:

Arthur Nash (businessman) (1870–1927)
Arthur Nash (architect) (1871-1969)
Arthur Nash (ice hockey) (1914-2000)